Marie Dušková (October 6, 1903 – December 14, 1968) was a Czech poet.

She was a participant of Pracující do literatury (Workers in Literature) and soon became known as an example of working-class literature of the 1950s.

External links
Marie Dušková in the National Library of the Czech Republic catalogue

Czech women writers
Czech poets
1903 births
1968 deaths
20th-century poets
20th-century women writers